"Beer" is the fifth episode of the BBC sitcom Blackadder II, the second series of Blackadder, which was set in Elizabethan England from 1558 to 1603. In the episode, an embarrassing incident with a turnip, an ostrich feather and a fanatically Puritan aunt leads to a right royal to-do in the Blackadder household. The episode marks Hugh Laurie's first ever Blackadder appearance, and Miriam Margolyes's second. Laurie would go on to appear in every subsequent episode of the show.

Plot 
Blackadder is having breakfast with Lord Percy when he receives a letter informing him that his fanatically Puritan but extremely wealthy aunt and uncle, Lord and Lady Whiteadder, will be visiting him to discuss the terms of his inheritance over dinner that evening. Before Edmund can revel in his fortune, a messenger arrives and informs him that Queen Elizabeth demands his presence at court.

Blackadder rushes to Richmond Palace to discover the Queen and Nursie tending to an ailing Lord Melchett, whom the Queen believes to be dying. However, it is quickly revealed that Melchett is simply suffering from a dire hangover. Blackadder mocks Melchett for his lack of alcoholic tolerance, while Melchett reminds Edmund of his own drunkenness during the visit of the King of Austria, during which Blackadder wandered naked around the grounds of Hampton Court singing "I'm Merlin, The Happy Pig". Blackadder challenges his rival to a drinking bout, with 10,000 florins at stake. After Blackadder leaves, Queenie conspires to somehow gain entry to the party.

Upon arriving back home, Blackadder begins to draft a guest list for the drinking party, with Percy's assistance. The guests include Simon Partridge, a perpetually drunken aristocrat nicknamed "Farters Parters" and "Mr. Ostrich" who according to Percy, is a fearful oik, Sir Geoffrey "Here's to the Health of Cardinal Chunder" Piddle, a deranged civil servant, and Freddie Frobisher, "the flatulent friar of Lindisfarne." Baldrick, fully aware that his master does not have ten thousand florins to gamble with, questions the wisdom of his master holding a drinking contest; according to the dogsbody, everyone knows once Blackadder has one drop of the ale, he falls flat on his face and starts singing "that song about the goblin". Things are further complicated when Percy reminds him that the puritan Whiteadders will also be coming around that evening. Blackadder hastily returns to the Queen and asks that the contest be moved to another night; however, she senses that he is trying to cop out of his promise (since she also knows about his tendency to sing about the goblin when drunk) and refuses to postpone the contest.

Back at his house, Blackadder decides to hold both events on the same evening but in different rooms. The drinking party is to be held in Baldrick's bedroom, while the Whiteadders are to dine with Percy in Blackadder's dining room. Blackadder is further annoyed when he's informed by Percy and Baldrick that while rooting through the vegetable patch for suitable food, they came across "a turnip shaped exactly like a thingie". To outlast Melchett at the drinking contest while simultaneously not making a fool out of himself in front of his aunt and uncle, Blackadder conjures up a plan to avoid alcohol without the other drinkers noticing, telling Baldrick to hand him water when he asks for his "incredibly strong ale" at the party.

The evening begins with the arrival of the Whiteadders, who, particularly Lady Whiteadder, are comically revealed to be maniacally devout and denounce most everyday comforts as the work of Satan, including chairs (for being comfortable; at home, Lord Whiteadder sits on a spike, with his wife sitting on him- "Two spikes would be extravagant"), mashed foodstuffs, (believing that mashing is not what God intended and was designed to destroy the "sacred shape" of vegetables), the concept of family (due to the requirement of sex) and warmth (since "cold is God's way of telling us to burn more Catholics").

To make matters worse, Lord Nathanial Whiteadder has taken a "vow of silence", leaving Edmund's abusive and volatile aunt to hold the conversation. Whenever Blackadder casually mentions a subject she disapproves of, Lady Whiteadder comically slaps him across the face twice and calls him "Wicked child!"

The drinking guests arrive, wearing fake comedy breasts and rubber noses on their foreheads. Melchett arrives shortly after, sporting a larger, golden pair of breasts. The intoxicated guests make Blackadder's situation even more difficult by being very rowdy, annoying and destructive, causing him to concoct increasingly ridiculous stories and lies to conceal what is going on from his aunt and uncle. Percy's imbecilic behaviour also greatly irritates Lady Whiteadder although she is pleasantly surprised by the "thingie-shaped" turnip. The Queen arrives at the party, disguised as Percy's girlfriend Gwendolyn, and Blackadder makes the mistake of locking her in the closet.

In the other room, Melchett calls Blackadder out on his efforts to participate in the drinking game. Blackadder then calls for his strong ale but Baldrick quickly exposes the supposed ale as being water much to the outrage of Melchett and the other competitors. In revenge, Melchett, Partridge and the other competitors force Blackadder to drink a very strong ale.

Forty-two seconds later, Blackadder re-enters the dining room blind drunk, bearing an ostrich feather up his bottom and wearing a cardinal's hat. His aunt recognises that he has been both drinking and gambling, and the Whiteadders make to leave. Blackadder realises he has not only lost the 10,000 florin bet with Melchett, but also the chance of (as he puts it) "a whopping-great inheritance".

However, things become rather confused when both parties accidentally meet in the hallway. Melchett's drinking crew assume the Whiteadders to be strippers, and release the Queen from the cupboard. With everyone silenced and kneeling after discovering who she really is, she announces she is going to first "have a little drinkie", and then execute everyone.

By dawn the following morning, everyone is drunk or rather hungover and sitting in Blackadder's dining room, singing along to his rendition of the goblin song. The guests are all confused as to what has happened: Melchett has forgotten about the drinking bet, Queenie has forgotten her threats of execution and Lord Whiteadder seems willing to discuss the inheritance, while Lady Whiteadder emerges from beneath Queenie's frock, and upon hearing Blackadder mention the word "luck", proclaims that it sounds rude, due to its sounding "almost exactly like 'fu–..' ". The credits roll before she finishes.

Cast 

 Rowan Atkinson as Edmund Blackadder
 Tim McInnerny as Lord Percy Percy
 Tony Robinson as Baldrick
 Miranda Richardson as Queen Elizabeth I
 Stephen Fry as Lord Melchett
 Patsy Byrne as Nursie
 Miriam Margolyes as Lady Whiteadder
 Daniel Thorndike as Lord Nathaniel Whiteadder; the role was originally offered to Jim Broadbent, who was unavailable, as a reference to the double act role he played opposite Margolyes in the first series.
 Hugh Laurie as Simon Partridge
 Roger Blake as Geoffrey Piddle
 William Hootkins as Freddie Frobisher, the flatulent hermit of Lindisfarne (listed as "Monk" in credits)

External links

 
 

Blackadder episodes
1986 British television episodes
Television shows written by Ben Elton
Cultural depictions of Elizabeth I
Television shows written by Richard Curtis